Christian Klein  is a German manager who is the current Chief Executive Officer at SAP SE. After the departure of Jennifer Morgan SAP SE is returning to sole CEO model.

Career
Klein started his career at SAP in 1999 as a student. Since October 11, 2019, Christian Klein and Jennifer Morgan were Co-CEOs of SAP SE. On April 30, 2020, Jennifer Morgan stepped down from her position as co-CEO, leaving Klein as sole CEO.

Klein is Chief Executive Officer, Chief Operating Officer and member of the Executive Board of SAP SE.

Personal life
Klein is a soccer fan and is an avid supporter of Ajax, Borussia Dortmund, Manchester City and FC Barcelona.

Other activities
 Adidas, Member of the Supervisory Board
 Baden-Badener Unternehmer-Gespräche (BBUG), Member of the Board (since 2019)

References

External links 
SAP Co-Chief Executive Officer Christian Klein Continues as CEO, Jennifer Morgan Departs
Jennifer Morgan / Co-Chief Executive Officer (Co-CEO) SAP SE

SAP SE people
1980 births
Living people